The Rodolfus Choir was founded by Ralph Allwood in 1984. It is a choir of singers aged 25 and younger, primarily selected from members of The Choral Course (formerly the Eton Choral Courses). It has toured extensively in the UK and abroad, and on top of performances at such venues as St John's, Smith Square and the Three Choirs Festival in Gloucester they have produced a considerable discography of music ranging from Monteverdi to Grier.

The name is derived from the Latin form of the name Ralph, Rudolphus.

Discography
Francis Grier: A Sequence for the Ascension - 1992 - Herald
Mater, Ora Filium - 1995 - Herald
Among the Leaves So Green - English and Scottish Folk Songs - 1995 - Herald
Francis Grier: Twelve Anthems - 1996 - Herald
Parry: Part-songs and Songs of Farewell - 1998 - Herald
Johann Ernst Eberlin - Sacred Choral Music - 2000 - Herald
By Special Arrangement - 2000 - Herald
A Christmas Collection - 2003 - Herald
Thomas Tallis: Latin and English motets and anthems - 2004 - Herald
Abendlied: German Romantic Motets - 2004 - Herald
Monteverdi Vespers of 1610 - 2007 - Signum Records
Choral Arrangements by Clytus Gottwald - 2007 - Signum
Choral Music by Herbert Howells - 2010 - Signum
Bach: Mass in B minor - 2010 - Signum
A Choral Christmas - 2011 - Signum
Edward Elgar: Go, song of mine - 2012 - Signum
the flowers have their angels  - 2013 - Signum
Daniel Purcell: The Judgment of Paris  - 2014 - resonus
Time and its Passing  - 2015 - Signum

References

External links

Ralph Allwood's Discography
Rodolfus Choir Online CD Shop
BBC Artist's page

resonus website

British choirs
Youth choirs

Musical groups established in 1984